The 2001 Latvian Individual Speedway Championship was the 27th Latvian Individual Speedway Championship season. The final took place on 28 June 2001 in Daugavpils, Latvia.

Results
 June 28, 2001
  Daugavpils

Speedway in Latvia
2001 in Latvian sport
2001 in speedway